The 1984 Nova Scotia general election was held on November 6, 1984 to elect members of the 54th House of Assembly of the Province of Nova Scotia, Canada. It was won by the Progressive Conservative party.

Results

Results by party

Retiring incumbents
Liberal
Joseph H. Casey, Digby
Hugh Tinkham, Argyle

Progressive Conservative
Ron Barkhouse, Lunenburg East
D. L. George Henley, Cumberland West
Edward Twohig, Kings North

Nominated candidates
Legend
bold denotes party leader
† denotes an incumbent who is not running for re-election or was defeated in nomination contest

Valley

|-
|bgcolor=whitesmoke|Annapolis East
||
|Gerry Sheehy3,73656.02%
|
|Nita M. Irvine2,01130.15%
|
|Joan M. Boutilier92213.83%
|
| 
|
|
||
|Gerry Sheehy
|-
|bgcolor=whitesmoke|Annapolis West
||
|Greg Kerr2,80953.68%
|
|Herb Anderson2,01938.58%
|
|Howard Langille4057.74%
|
|
|
|
||
|Greg Kerr
|-
|bgcolor=whitesmoke|Clare
||
|Guy LeBlanc3,09450.33%
|
|Chester Melanson2,78445.29%
|
|Alain Chabot2694.38%
|
|
|
|
||
|Chester Melanson
|-
|bgcolor=whitesmoke|Digby
||
|Merryl Lawton3,45160.66%
|
|Paul Scovil1,65729.13%
|
|Susan Jamieson58110.21%
|
|
|
|
||
|Joseph H. Casey†
|-
|bgcolor=whitesmoke|Hants West
||
|Ron Russell4,63455.65%
|
|Robert D. Lindsay2,53530.44%
|
|Alan St. C. Squires1,15813.91%
|
|
|
|
||
|Ron Russell
|-
|bgcolor=whitesmoke|Kings North
||
|George Archibald3,65549.57%
|
|Bob Wilson1,85825.20%
|
|Don Fraser1,86025.23%
|
|
|
|
||
|Edward Twohig†
|-
|bgcolor=whitesmoke|Kings South
|
|Paul Kinsman3,67345.31%
|
|Alan Sponagle6257.71%
||
|Bob Levy3,69445.57%
|
|
|
|Doug Milligan1141.41%
||
|Paul Kinsman
|-
|bgcolor=whitesmoke|Kings West
||
|George Moody5,27360.45%
|
|Doug McKeil2,54629.19%
|
|Ted Davis90410.36%
|
|
|
|
||
|George Moody
|}

South Shore

|-
|bgcolor=whitesmoke|Argyle
||
|Neil LeBlanc2,89452.51%
|
|J. Donald Doucette2,42243.95%
|
|Lawrence Meuse1953.54%
|
| 
|
|
||
|Hugh Tinkham†
|-
|bgcolor=whitesmoke|Lunenburg Centre
||
|Maxine Cochran5,23956.60%
|
|Linton M. Wentzell2,66928.83%
|
|Angus J. Fields1,34914.57%
|
|
|
|
||
|Maxine Cochran
|-
|bgcolor=whitesmoke|Lunenburg East
|
|David Hatt1,76432.10%
||
|Jim Barkhouse2,69649.06%
|
|Janet Mooney1,03518.84%
|
|
|
|
||
|Ron Barkhouse†
|-
|bgcolor=whitesmoke|Lunenburg West
||
|Mel Pickings3,43551.25%
|
|Caroll W. Young2,16232.25%
|
|Martha Laurence1,10616.50%
|
|
|
|
||
|Mel Pickings
|-
|bgcolor=whitesmoke|Queens
||
|John Leefe3,66159.92%
|
|Hugh Mosher1,53225.07%
|
|Bill Zimmerman91715.01%
|
|
|
|
||
|John Leefe
|-
|bgcolor=whitesmoke|Shelburne
|
|Ron Leary3,65943.88%
||
|Harold Huskilson3,84346.09%
|
|Laurie Hitchens6017.21%
|
|
|
|Etheren Goreham2352.82%
||
|Harold Huskilson
|-
|bgcolor=whitesmoke|Yarmouth 
||
|Alex McIntosh4,40049.16%
|
|Fraser Mooney3,75541.96%
|
|Brian Doucette7958.88%
|
| 
|
|
||
|Fraser Mooney
|}

Fundy-Northeast

|-
|bgcolor=whitesmoke|Colchester North
||
|Jack Coupar3,79646.65%
|
|Ed Lorraine3,63644.68%
|
|Alan M. Marchbank7068.68%
|
|
|
|
||
|Ed Lorraine
|-
|bgcolor=whitesmoke|Colchester South
||
|R. Colin Stewart3,57263.85%
|
|Fred A. Kennedy1,53027.35%
|
|Bernard A. Gay4928.80%
|
|
|
|
||
|R. Colin Stewart
|-
|bgcolor=whitesmoke|Cumberland Centre
|
|Douglas Marshall1,80441.03%
||
|Guy Brown2,43655.40%
|
|Stanley H. McCormick1573.57%
|
|
|
|
||
|Guy Brown
|-
|bgcolor=whitesmoke|Cumberland East
||
|Roger Stuart Bacon4,83761.35%
|
|Ira Drysdale2,34929.79%
|
|Barbara Anne Marsden6988.85%
|
|
|
|
||
|Roger Stuart Bacon
|-
|bgcolor=whitesmoke|Cumberland West
||
|Gardner Hurley2,50351.77%
|
|Gary Gordon1,84538.16%
|
|Sandy Graham48710.07%
|
|
|
|
||
|D. L. George Henley†
|-
|bgcolor=whitesmoke|Hants East
||
|Cora Etter3,73048.57%
|
|Jack Hawkins3,19241.57%
|
|Herbert H. Radley7579.86%
|
|
|
|
||
|Jack Hawkins
|-
|bgcolor=whitesmoke|Truro—Bible Hill
||
|Ron Giffin5,00861.03%
|
|Kirby Eileen Grant2,25327.46%
|
|Andy Belliveau94511.52%
|
|
|
|
||
|Ron Giffin
|}

Central Halifax

|-
|bgcolor=whitesmoke|Halifax Bedford Basin
||
|Joel Matheson5,61347.32%
|
|Alan Weeks2,22418.75%
|
|Paul Fiander4,02433.93%
|
|
|
|
||
|Joel Matheson
|-
|bgcolor=whitesmoke|Halifax Chebucto
|
|Helen Gillis2,63029.85%
|
|Dan Clarke1,80620.50%
||
|Alexa McDonough4,37449.65%
|
|
|
|
||
|Alexa McDonough
|-
|bgcolor=whitesmoke|Halifax Citadel
||
|Art Donahoe3,65240.40%
|
|John Godfrey2,52427.92%
|
|Eileen O'Connell2,86431.68%
|
|
|
|
||
|Art Donahoe
|-
|bgcolor=whitesmoke|Halifax Cornwallis
||
|Terry Donahoe5,27347.80%
|
|Dale Godsoe2,75324.96%
|
|Tim Hill3,00527.24%
|
|
|
|
||
|Terry Donahoe
|-
|bgcolor=whitesmoke|Halifax Needham
||
|Edmund L. Morris3,17339.97%
|
|Walter Fitzgerald2,20827.81%
|
|Maureen MacDonald2,51431.67%
|
|Beatrice Kaizer440.55%
|
|
||
|Edmund L. Morris
|}

Suburban Halifax

|-
|bgcolor=whitesmoke|Bedford-Musquodoboit Valley
||
|Ken Streatch4,95359.98%
|
|John M. Dillon1,75521.25%
|
|Susan Coldwell1,46817.78%
|
|Alfred Nieforth820.99%
|
|
||
|Ken Streatch
|-
|bgcolor=whitesmoke|Halifax Atlantic
||
|John Buchanan5,52858.37%
|
|David C. Melnick1,88819.93%
|
|Rene Quigley1,94220.50%
|
|
|
|Arthur R. Canning1131.19%
||
|John Buchanan
|-
|bgcolor=whitesmoke|Halifax-St. Margaret's
||
|Jerry Lawrence5,14157.39%
|
|Michael N. Kelly1,55917.40%
|
|Lillian Viau2,25825.21%
|
|
|
|
||
|Jerry Lawrence
|-
|bgcolor=whitesmoke|Sackville
|
|Malcolm A. MacKay2,99726.49%
|
|Bill MacDonald3,76333.26%
||
|John Holm4,55540.26%
|
|
|
|
||
|Malcolm A. MacKay
|-
|}

Dartmouth/Cole Harbour/Eastern Shore

|-
|bgcolor=whitesmoke|Cole Harbour
||
|David Nantes5,28361.49%
|
|Dennis F. Cuvelier1,61418.78%
|
|Les MacDougall1,69519.73%
|
|
|
|
||
|David Nantes
|-
|bgcolor=whitesmoke|Dartmouth East
|
|Richard L. Weldon3,10133.84%
||
|Jim Smith4,00443.70%
|
|Gerry Legere2,05822.46%
|
|
|
|
||
|Richard L. Weldon
|-
|bgcolor=whitesmoke|Dartmouth North
||
|Laird Stirling3,20043.45%
|
|Pat Connolly2,15029.20%
|
|Chester Sanford1,93826.32%
|
|Ron Bugbee761.03%
|
|
||
|Laird Stirling
|-
|bgcolor=whitesmoke|Dartmouth South
||
|Roland J. Thornhill4,53458.20%
|
|Don Walker1,66621.39%
|
|Fred Lutley1,59020.41%
|
|
|
|
||
|Roland J. Thornhill
|-
|bgcolor=whitesmoke|Halifax Eastern Shore
||
|Tom McInnis5,39562.74%
|
|Paul MacKenzie2,15125.01%
|
|Kevin Wilson1,05312.25%
|
|
|
|
||
|Tom McInnis
|-
|}

Central Nova

|-
|bgcolor=whitesmoke|Antigonish 
|
|Liz Chisholm4,85444.89%
||
|Bill Gillis5,16747.78%
|
|Bill Woodfine7937.33%
|
|
|
|
||
|Bill Gillis
|-
|bgcolor=whitesmoke|Guysborough
||
|Chuck MacNeil3,85950.70%
|
|A.M. "Sandy" Cameron3,46945.57%
|
|Elsie Richard2843.73%
|
|
|
|
||
|A.M. "Sandy" Cameron
|-
|bgcolor=whitesmoke|Pictou Centre
||
|Jack MacIsaac6,59667.11%
|
|Bob Leahy2,10321.40%
|
|Kim Murray1,13011.50%
|
|
|
|
||
|Jack MacIsaac
|-
|bgcolor=whitesmoke|Pictou East
||
|Donald Cameron4,36763.75%
|
|Scott Johnston1,75425.61%
|
|Larry Duchesne72910.64%
|
|
|
|
||
|Donald Cameron
|-
|bgcolor=whitesmoke|Pictou West
||
|Donald P. McInnes3,84459.78%
|
|Bob Naylor1,93230.05%
|
|Lynn Curwin-Porteous4867.56%
|
|
|
|Franklin R. Fiske1682.61%
||
|Donald P. McInnes
|}

Cape Breton

|-
|bgcolor=whitesmoke|Cape Breton Centre
||
|Mike Laffin4,58658.83%
|
|A. Beaver Parsons1,26416.22%
|
|Angus Grant7439.53%
|
|Dan MacKinnon1,20215.42%
|
|
||
|Mike Laffin
|-
|bgcolor=whitesmoke|Cape Breton East
||
|Donnie MacLeod9,82296.33%
|
|Cha Keliher3,57933.62%
|
|Jim Jobe5555.21%
|
|Blair Matheson1,72416.20%
|
|
||
|Donnie MacLeod
|-
|bgcolor=whitesmoke|Cape Breton North
||
|Brian Young6,43170.01%
|
|Hank Lamond1,63717.82%
|
|Tom Rose7097.72%
|
|M.J. Julian4094.45%
|
|
||
|Brian Young
|-
|bgcolor=whitesmoke|Cape Breton Nova
|
|Jim Neville1,74723.87%
|
|John Ryan1,06614.56%
|
|Alex MacIsaac6749.21%
||
|Paul MacEwan3,83252.36%
|
|
||
|Paul MacEwan
|-
|bgcolor=whitesmoke|Cape Breton South
|
|Murdock Smith5,04942.04%
||
|Vince MacLean5,96149.63%
|
|John Chisholm6335.27%
|
|Kim MacEwan3673.06%
|
|
||
|Vince MacLean
|-
|bgcolor=whitesmoke|Cape Breton—The Lakes
||
|John Newell4,53551.29%
|
|John Coady3,33837.75%
|
|Richard Fogarty8139.19%
|
|Mary Strickland1561.76%
|
|
||
|John Newell
|-
|bgcolor=whitesmoke|Cape Breton West
||
|"Big" Donnie MacLeod9,82296.33%
|
|Russell MacKinnon3,92540.04%
|
|Terry Crawley5825.94%
|
|Linda Martin2612.66%
|
|
||
|"Big" Donnie MacLeod
|-
|bgcolor=whitesmoke|Inverness North
||
|Norman J. MacLean3,47545.57%
|
|John Archie MacKenzie3,20942.08%
|
|Ben Boucher91311.97%
|
|Nancy Thomas290.38%
|
|
||
|John Archie MacKenzie
|-
|bgcolor=whitesmoke|Inverness South
||
|Billy Joe MacLean3,34963.44%
|
|Danny Graham1,73632.83%
|
|Al MacKinnon2464.65%
|
|Laddie Golemiec330.62%
|
|
||
|Billy Joe MacLean
|-
|bgcolor=whitesmoke|Richmond
||
|Greg MacIsaac3,26247.20%
|
|Richie Mann2,79040.37%
|
|Shirley McNamara82811.98%
|
|Ken Covey310.45%
|
|
||
|Greg MacIsaac
|-
|bgcolor=whitesmoke|Victoria
||
|Fisher Hudson2,49850.76%
|
|Elmourne K. MacKinnon1,96039.83%
|
|Fraser Patterson3877.86%
|
|Bernice MacLean761.54%
|
|
||
|Fisher Hudson
|}

References

1984
Nova Scotia general election
General election
Nova Scotia general election